Ornarantia scenophora is a moth in the family Choreutidae. It was described by Edward Meyrick in 1922. It is found in Peru.

References

Choreutidae
Moths described in 1922
Taxa named by Edward Meyrick